George Vesey Stewart (1832–1920) was a notable New Zealand farmer, coloniser and local politician. He was born in Brighton, Sussex, England in about 1832.

The  in the newly formed  electorate was hotly contested. Four candidates were nominated: George Morris, who had previously represented the  electorate; Stewart, then the owner of the Bay of Plenty Times; William Kelly, who had also previously represented the East Coast electorate; and Henry Thomas Rowe, a surveyor and commission agent. Rowe announced his retirement from the contest on 6 December three days out from election day, urging his supporters to vote for Stewart instead. The unofficial results were released the day after the election (on Saturday, 10 December) and Morris had a majority of 13 votes over Stewart, with the official declaration to be made on 12 December. This was deferred until 14 December, with Morris ahead by 10 votes. Stewart stood for the Tauranga mayoralty a few months later and was elected the town's first mayor.

His brother's wife was Adela Blanche Stewart, who wrote the book My Simple Life in New Zealand.

References

1832 births
1920 deaths
New Zealand farmers
English emigrants to New Zealand
Mayors of Tauranga
Unsuccessful candidates in the 1881 New Zealand general election
Unsuccessful candidates in the 1893 New Zealand general election
People from Brighton